Hide Kengei Vitalucci  (born 1 January 2002) is a Japanese professional footballer who plays as a forward for Italian  club Pergolettese.

Career
A former youth academy player of Nagoya Grampus, Vitalucci joined Italian club Frosinone in 2019. Prior to 2021–22 season, he joined Pergolettese on a season long loan deal. He made his professional debut for the club on 21 August 2021 in a 0–0 Coppa Italia Serie C draw against Pro Vercelli.

Personal life
Born in Japan, Vitalucci also holds an Italian passport, which makes him eligible to represent Italy in international football.

Career statistics

Club

References

External links
 

2002 births
Living people
Japanese people of Italian descent
Association football forwards
Japanese footballers
Frosinone Calcio players
U.S. Pergolettese 1932 players
Serie C players
Japanese expatriate footballers
Japanese expatriate sportspeople in Italy
Expatriate footballers in Italy